Scirum or Skiron or Skira (Σκίρα) was a small place in ancient Attica near a torrent of the same name, just outside the Athenian walls on the Sacred Way. It was not a demus, and derived its name from Scirus, a prophet of Dodona, who fell in the battle between the Eleusinii and Erechtheus, and was buried in this spot.

Scirum's site is unlocated.

References

Populated places in ancient Attica
Former populated places in Greece
Locations in Greek mythology
Lost ancient cities and towns